Birdhill is a village in County Tipperary, Ireland. It is in the barony of Owney and Arra and is part of the parish of Newport, Birdhill and Toor in the Roman Catholic Archdiocese of Cashel and Emly. Its Irish name was historically anglicised as Knockan or Knockaneeneen.

Location
The village is located at the junction of the R445 (formerly N7), the R466, R504 and the R494 about 20 km from Limerick. The R494 route connects Birdhill to the M7. 
Public transport is provided by Bus Éireann who provide hourly bus services to Limerick and Dublin from Birdhill.
Birdhill railway station is served by two weekday trains each way on the Limerick–Ballybrophy railway line and a skeleton service on the Limerick to Nenagh Commuter Service.

Railway line

Birdhill railway station is on the Limerick–Ballybrophy railway line.
A January 2012 national newspaper article suggested that Irish Rail was expected to seek permission from the National Transport Authority to close the line. An enhanced timetable was in force during 2012 however the service was again reduced from February 2013.

Economy

Birdhill is home to the Matt The Threshers Bar & Restaurant in the centre of the village which opened in 1984. Adjacent to the restaurant is the Old Barracks Coffee Roastery, which roasts its own coffee and has an in-house coffee shop, which opened in 2018. Across the road is the Coopers Bar.

Petrogas opened a service area in October 2014 at junction 27 of the M7 at Birdhill. The Applegreen branded service area contains a Costa Coffee and a Burger King franchise. Traffic uses the existing slip roads with westbound traffic then passing over the motorway bridge.

River Shannon to Dublin pipeline
Plans were announced in 2011 for a pipeline  from Lough Derg to supply drinking water to Dublin city and region. In 2016 the Parteen Basin at the south of lough was chosen as the proposed site of extraction. Water would be pumped via Birdhill to a break pressure tank at Knockanacree in County Tipperary and gravity fed from there to Peamount in Dublin.

Awards
Birdhill was named the "Tidiest Village" in the Tidy Towns Awards in 2006, 2007, 2008, 2016 and again in 2017. In 2017, the village also took the overall award and was named Ireland's "Tidiest Town".

Sport
Birdhill FC is the local soccer team, which competes in the North Tipperary District League. It fields a number of youth teams and one junior team, which competes in the NTDL Division 2. In February 2019, Birdhill FC won the NTDL Nora Kennedy Cup In July 2021, the men's junior team won the 2020/2021 NTDL Division 2 league title and were promoted up to the NTDL Division 1.

See also
 List of towns and villages in Ireland

References

Towns and villages in County Tipperary
Owney and Arra